HMAS Moreton is a Royal Australian Navy (RAN) base located in , Brisbane, Queensland, Australia, responsible for providing administrative support to RAN personnel and visiting warships. It was originally established as a naval base located at New Farm, Brisbane in 1932, and was decommissioned in 1994; and recommissioned in 2016.

History
The naval base was opened in 1932 as HMAS Penguin IV and on 1 August 1940 it was renamed as HMAS Brisbane. The base was again renamed HMAS Moreton in 1942. The base was located at the corner of Merthyr Road and Gray Street, in New Farm, Brisbane and had its own wharves, warehouse buildings and assembly areas.

Post Vietnam the base was home to the Royal Australian Navy's amphibious forces including  and the  landing craft. For much of this time much of the army's amphibious capacity was based locally. Gallipoli Barracks based 6th Battalion, Royal Australian Regiment was Australia's lead amphibious assault unit whilst 35 Water Transport Squadron was based at Bulimba Barracks, Brisbane, Queensland with LCM.

HMAS Moreton was decommissioned in 1994 and many of its services relocated to Bulimba Barracks under the authority of Naval Headquarters Southern Queensland.

The site of the former base has been transformed into residential apartments. Two historic buildings associated with the base, the Commonwealth Acetate of Lime Factory and Amity, are listed on the Queensland Heritage Register.

As part of the partial disposal of Bulimba Barracks, Naval Headquarters Southern Queensland was renamed HMAS Moreton on 14 May 2016. At this time the establishment was staffed by a small number of personnel.

Future
Plans have been announced that Moreton will have a new gatehouse with improved security including CCTV. Construction is expected to commence late 2017 and be completed in early 2019.

See also

List of Royal Australian Navy bases

References

M
Military installations established in 1932
1932 establishments in Australia
Buildings and structures in Brisbane
Military buildings and structures